The notable Alumni of the Royal Military College and the Royal Military Academy Sandhurst are very numerous. In particular, there are so many generals and Victoria Cross holders from the former Royal Military College, Sandhurst, that a full list would be immense. 

This list contains a number of students who did not complete the course. Some of the members of foreign royal families were not commissioned into the British Army.

Despite claims to the contrary, Idi Amin and Muammar Gaddafi did not attend Sandhurst. 

The Sandhurst Foundation acts as a community for the alumni of the Royal Military Academy.

Royalty

Commonwealth realms
William, Prince of Wales ("William Wales") (Blues and Royals)
Prince Harry, Duke of Sussex ("Harry Wales") (Blues and Royals)
Prince Michael of Kent (11th Hussars)
Prince Edward, Duke of Kent (Royal Scots Greys)
Prince Henry, Duke of Gloucester (The King's Royal Rifle Corps)
Prince Arthur of Connaught (7th Queen's Own Hussars)
Prince Francis of Teck (9th Queen's Royal Lancers)
Prince Adolphus, Duke of Teck (17th Lancers)
Prince Christian Victor of Schleswig-Holstein (King's Royal Rifles)

Albania
King Leka I
King Leka II

Bahrain
Hamad bin Isa Al-Khalifa, King of Bahrain
Sheikh Nasser bin Hamad Al Khalifa
Sheikh Khalid bin Hamad Al Khalifa

Bhutan
His Royal Highness Prince Dasho Khamsum Singye Wangchuck

Brunei
Hassanal Bolkiah, Sultan of Brunei
Prince Mohamed, son of Omar Ali Saifuddien III
Prince Azim, son of Hassanal Bolkiah
Prince Mateen, son of Hassanal Bolkiah
Halbi bin Mohammad Yussof

Greece
Pavlos, Crown Prince of Greece (Royal Scots Dragoon Guards (Carabiniers and Greys))

India
Prince Mukarram Jah, titular Nizam of Hyderabad
Prince Victor Duleep Singh - Head of the Royal House of the Punjab

Jordan
King Hussein of Jordan
King Abdullah II of Jordan (13th/18th Royal Hussars (Queen Mary's Own))
King Talal of Jordan
Princess Aisha of Jordan
Princess Iman of Jordan
Prince Ali of Jordan
Prince Hamzah of Jordan
Prince Hashim of Jordan
Prince Rashid of Jordan
Princess Basma Fatima of Jordan
Prince Talal of Jordan
Crown Prince Hussein
Princess Salma of Jordan

Kuwait
Sheikh Fahad Ahmad Al-Jaber Al-Sabah
Abdullah the son of Mohammed Khaled Al-Khadher who is Chief of Staff of Kuwait Armed Forces
Sheikh Ali Sabah Al-Salim Al-Sabah, son of previous Emir of Kuwait and ex Minister of Defence
Sheikh Ahmed Khaled Al Jarrah Al Sabah, son of Minister of Interior
Sheikh Thamer Jaber al-Ahmad al-Sabah, son of previous Emir of Kuwait, current Ambassador to the Kingdom of Bahrain
Sheikh Abdullah Nasser Sabah Al-Ahmad Al-Sabah, grandson of Emir of Kuwait
Sheikh Mubarak Abdullah Al-Jaber Al-Sabah, first Chief of the General Staff of the Kuwaiti Army
Sheikh Khalid Sabah Al-Khalid Al-Sabah, son of Prime Minister

Liechtenstein
Alois, Hereditary Prince of Liechtenstein (Coldstream Guards)
Prince Franz Josef of Liechtenstein (Grenadier Guards).

Luxembourg
Henri, Grand Duke of Luxembourg
Guillaume, Hereditary Grand Duke of Luxembourg
Jean, Grand Duke of Luxembourg (Irish Guards)
Prince Jean of Luxembourg
Prince Sebastian of Luxembourg
Prince Wenceslas of Nassau

Malaysia
Sirajuddin, Raja of Perlis
Abdullah, Yang di-Pertuan Agong XVI of Malaysia
Mizan Zainal Abidin, Sultan of Terengganu
Tengku Amir Shah, Raja Muda of Selangor
Tengku Hassanal Ibrahim Alam Shah, Regent of Pahang
Tengku Amir Nasser Ibrahim Shah, Tengku Panglima Raja of Pahang
Tengku Ahmad Ismail Mu’adzam Shah, Tengku Panglima Perang of Pahang

Nepal
 Jung Bahadur Rana
Chief of Army Staff General Satchit Rana.
 Chief of the Army Staff General Gaurav Shumsher JB Rana

Oman
Qaboos bin Said al Said Sultan of Oman from 1970 to 2020 (The Cameronians (Scottish Rifles))
Theyazin bin Haitham  Crown Prince of Oman (Son of Haitham bin Tariq Sultan of Oman)

Qatar
Sheikh Tamim bin Hamad Al Thani - Emir of Qatar
Sheikh Hamad bin Khalifa Al Thani - Emir of Qatar from 1995 to 2013
Sheikh Jasim bin Hamad bin Khalifa Al Thani - former heir apparent
Sheikh Abdullah bin Khalifa Al Thani - Prime Minister of Qatar from 1996 to 2007
Sheikh Hamad bin Khalid Al Thani
Sheikh Hamad bin Jassim bin Hamad Al Thani

Saudi Arabia
Prince Mutaib bin Abdullah
Prince Khaled bin Abdullah
Prince Khalid bin Sultan
Prince Khalid bin Bandar
Prince Saud bin Abdul-Muhsin
Prince Sultan bin Fahd
Prince Turki bin Talal

Spain
King Alfonso XII of Spain

Sri Lanka
General Rohan Daluwatte (1941-2018), Commander of the Sri Lanka Army from 1996-1998
General Gerry Hector De Silva (born 1940), Commander of the Sri Lanka Army from 1994-1996
General Nalin Seneviratne (1931-2009), Commander of the Sri Lanka Army from 1985-1988
General Cecil Waidyaratne (1938-2001), Commander of the Sri Lanka Army from 1991-1993
General Hamilton Wanasinghe (born 1935), Commander of the Sri Lanka Army from 1988-1991
General Tissa Weeratunga (1930-2003), Commander of the Sri Lanka Army from 1981-1985

Eswatini
Luhlabo Gcina Dhlamini, son of King Mswati III

Tonga
King George Tupou V of Tonga

Thailand
King Vajiravudh of Thailand (Durham Light Infantry)

United Arab Emirates
Mohamed bin Zayed Al Nahyan - Ruler of Abu Dhabi and President of UAE
Hamdan bin Mohammed Al Maktoum - Crown Prince of Dubai
Rashid bin Mohammed Al Maktoum - hereditary Prince of Dubai
Mohammed bin Rashid Al Maktoum - Ruler of Dubai
Majid bin Mohammed Al Maktoum - hereditary Prince of Dubai
Khalifa bin Zayed Al Nahyan - Ruler of Abu Dhabi
Abdullah Bin Rashid Al Mualla  - deputy ruler of Umm Al Quwain

Aristocracy 
 Richard Airey, 1st Baron Airey (34th (Cumberland) Regiment of Foot)
 Harold Alexander, 1st Earl Alexander of Tunis
 Denis Alexander, 6th Earl of Caledon (Irish Guards)
 Edmund Allenby, 1st Viscount Allenby 6th (Inniskilling) Dragoons
 Dudley Allenby, 2nd Viscount Allenby
 Michael Allenby, 3rd Viscount Allenby (Royal Hussars)
 Patrick Anson, 5th Earl of Lichfield (Grenadier Guards)
 Keith Arbuthnott, 15th Viscount of Arbuthnott
 George Baillie-Hamilton, 12th Earl of Haddington
 Joseph Bailey, 2nd Baron Glanusk
 Tufton Beamish, Baron Chelwood
 Henry Bentinck, 11th Earl of Portland
 George Bingham, 5th Earl of Lucan
 George Bingham, 6th Earl of Lucan
 William Birdwood, 1st Baron Birdwood (Royal Scots Fusiliers)
 Michael Bowes-Lyon, 18th Earl of Strathmore and Kinghorne (Scots Guards)
 Basil Brooke, 1st Viscount Brookeborough (Royal Fusiliers)
 Alan Burns, 4th Baron Inverclyde (Scots Guards)
 George Byng, 2nd Earl of Strafford
 Alexander Cambridge, 1st Earl of Athlone (7th Queen's Own Hussars)
 Peter Carington, 6th Baron Carrington (Grenadier Guards)
 Alan Cathcart, 6th Earl Cathcart
 Ferdinand Cavendish-Bentinck, 8th Duke of Portland
 Lord Eustace Cecil
 Richard Chaloner, 1st Baron Gisborough
 Dermot Chichester, 7th Marquess of Donegall (7th Queen's Own Hussars)
 Arthur Chichester, 4th Baron Templemore (Royal Fusiliers)
 William Clements, 3rd Earl of Leitrim
 William Duke Coleridge, 5th Baron Coleridge (Coldstream Guards)
 William Conolly-Carew, 6th Baron Carew
 Wykeham Cornwallis, 2nd Baron Cornwallis
 John Crichton, 5th Earl Erne
 Roland Cubitt, 3rd Baron Ashcombe
 Peregrine Cust, 6th Baron Brownlow (Grenadier Guards)
 Thomas Denman, 3rd Baron Denman
 Herbert Dixon, 1st Baron Glentoran (Royal Inniskilling Fusiliers)
 Daniel Dixon, 2nd Baron Glentoran (Grenadier Guards)
 Malcolm Douglas-Pennant, 6th Baron Penrhyn
 Thomas Dugdale, 1st Baron Crathorne
 John Eliot, 6th Earl of St Germans (Royal Scots Greys)
 Francis Fane, 12th Earl of Westmorland
 Bernard Fergusson, Baron Ballantrae
 Ronald Munro Ferguson, 1st Viscount Novar (Grenadier Guards)
 Charles FitzRoy, 10th Duke of Grafton
 Gerald FitzGerald, 8th Duke of Leinster (5th Royal Inniskilling Dragoon Guards)
 Arthur Foljambe, 2nd Earl of Liverpool
 Nigel Forbes, 22nd Lord Forbes (Grenadier Guards)
 Ian Fraser, Baron Fraser of Lonsdale
 David Freeman-Mitford, 2nd Baron Redesdale
 Thomas Fermor-Hesketh, 1st Baron Hesketh (Royal Horse Guards)
 Arthur French, 5th Baron de Freyne
 Shane Gough, 5th Viscount Gough
 Ralph Glyn, 1st Baron Glyn
 Gerald Grosvenor, 4th Duke of Westminster
 Gerald Grosvenor, 6th Duke of Westminster (North Irish Horse)
 Douglas Haig, 1st Earl Haig (7th Queen's Own Hussars)
 Richard Harries, Baron Harries of Pentregarth (Royal Corps of Signals
 Antony Head, 1st Viscount Head
 Victor Hervey, 6th Marquess of Bristol
 John Hope, 1st Marquess of Linlithgow
 Arthur Hope, 2nd Baron Rankeillour
 Michael Hughes-Young, 1st Baron St Helens
 Guy Innes-Ker, 10th Duke of Roxburghe
 Charles Innes-Ker, Marquess of Bowmont and Cessford (Blues and Royals)
 Hastings Ismay, 1st Baron Ismay (21st Prince Albert Victor's Own Cavalry)
 George Jeffreys, 1st Baron Jeffreys
 George Jellicoe, 2nd Earl Jellicoe (Coldstream Guards)
 Norton Knatchbull, 6th Baron Brabourne
 Francis Knollys, 1st Viscount Knollys
 Galbraith Lowry-Corry, 7th Earl Belmore
 Anthony Lowther, Viscount Lowther
 Frederick Lugard, 1st Baron Lugard
 Noel Lytton, 4th Earl of Lytton
 William Mansfield, 1st Baron Sandhurst
 Hugh Molyneux, 7th Earl of Sefton
 Lord William Montagu-Douglas-Scott
 William Napier, 13th Lord Napier
 Nigel Napier, 14th Lord Napier
 Roger Nathan, 2nd Baron Nathan
 Cyril Newall, 1st Baron Newall (Royal Warwickshire Regiment)
 Francis Newall, 2nd Baron Newall
 David Nickson, Baron Nickson
 David Ogilvy, 12th Earl of Airlie
 Thomas Towneley O'Hagan, 2nd Baron O'Hagan
 William Onslow, 6th Earl of Onslow
 William Orde-Powlett, 5th Baron Bolton
 Charles Paget, 6th Marquess of Anglesey
 Osbert Peake, 1st Viscount Ingleby
 Edward Plunkett, 18th Baron of Dunsany
 Harry Primrose, 6th Earl of Rosebery (Grenadier Guards)
 Henry Rawlinson, 1st Baron Rawlinson (King's Royal Rifle Corps)
 Peter Rawlinson, Baron Rawlinson of Ewell
 Frederick Roberts, 1st Earl Roberts (Bengal Artillery)
 Hercules Robinson, 1st Baron Rosmead (87th Foot)
 Anthony Royle, Baron Fanshawe of Richmond (Life Guards)
 Charles Sackville-West, 4th Baron Sackville (King's Royal Rifle Corps)
 Edward Seymour, 16th Duke of Somerset
 Evelyn Seymour, 17th Duke of Somerset
 Philip Sidney, 2nd Viscount De L'Isle
 Archibald Sinclair, 1st Viscount Thurso (Life Guards)
 John Sinclair, 1st Baron Pentland
 Randal Smith, 2nd Baron Bicester
 Henry Somerset, 10th Duke of Beaufort (Royal Horse Guards)
 George Somerset, 3rd Baron Raglan (Grenadier Guards)
 FitzRoy Somerset, 4th Baron Raglan
 John Spencer, 8th Earl Spencer (Royal Scots Greys)
 William Stanhope, 11th Earl of Harrington
 Frederick Stanley, 16th Earl of Derby (Grenadier Guards)
 Christopher Thomson, 1st Baron Thomson (Royal Engineers)
 George Tryon, 1st Baron Tryon (Grenadier Guards)
 Charles Tryon, 2nd Baron Tryon
 John Verney, 20th Baron Willoughby de Broke
 Henry Ward, 5th Viscount Bangor
 John Warrender, 2nd Baron Bruntisfield
 Archibald Wavell, 1st Earl Wavell (Black Watch)
 Piers Wedgwood, 4th Baron Wedgwood
 Luke White, 6th Baron Annaly
 Michael Willoughby, 11th Baron Middleton
 Alexander Windsor, Earl of Ulster (King's Royal Hussars) - 20th in line to the British Throne and heir to the Dukedom of Gloucester
 Alastair Windsor, 2nd Duke of Connaught and Strathearn (Royal Scots Greys)
 Barry Yelverton, 5th Viscount Avonmore

Government

Lieutenant General Akwasi Afrifa - 3rd Head of state of Ghana
Anastasio Somoza Portocarrero - Nicaragua - 1973
 Brigadier David Lansana - Force Commander Sierra Leone Army, acting Head of State of Sierra Leone.
 Sir Winston Churchill (4th Queen's Own Hussars) - twice Prime Minister of the United Kingdom, so far only one to graduate from Sandhurst.
Iain Duncan Smith (Scots Guards) - Member of Parliament
Patrick Mercer (Worcestershire and Sherwood Foresters Regiment (29th/45th Foot)) - Member of Parliament
Tobias Ellwood - Member of Parliament, Parliamentary Under-Secretary of State at the Ministry of Defence
Sir Robert Cary, 1st Baronet (4th/7th Royal Dragoon Guards)
 Brigadier John Amadu Bangura, CBE - Chief of the Defence Staff of the Sierra Leone Armed Forces 1968 to 1970; Acting Governor-General of Sierra Leone (1968)
Rajendrasinhji Jadeja - 1st Chief of Army Staff of the Indian army
Ghanem bin Shaheen bin Ghanem Al Ghanim - Qatari Minister of Endowments and Islamic Affairs
Syed Shahid Hamid - general in the Pakistan Army
Hassan Katsina - Nigerian general, son of the Emir of Katsina, and military governor of the Northern Region of Nigeria
Sir Oswald Mosley, 6th Baronet (16th The Queen's Lancers)
Peter Carington, 6th Baron Carrington  (Grenadier Guards)
Iskander Mirza (The Cameronians (Scottish Rifles)) - the 1st President of Pakistan
Lieutenant General Fred Akuffo- former Head of State of Ghana
Mohammad Ayub Khan (14th Punjab Regiment) -  President of Pakistan
 Major General Iliya D. Bisalla - Former commissioner of Defence of Nigeria
William Champ (63rd (West Suffolk) Regiment of Foot) - the 1st Premier of Tasmania
Seretse Khama Ian Khama - President of Botswana
 General Yakubu Gowon - 3rd Nigerian Head of State
 Major Chukwuma Kaduna Nzeogwu - leader of the first military coup in Nigeria
 Major Chris Anuforo - participant in the first military coup in Nigeria 
Kanwar Bahadur Singh - senior officer in the Indian Army
Ahmed Mohammed Ali - Media Adviser to the Egyptian President 
  Major-General Neville Alexander Odartey-Wellington- Ghanaian Army Commander
 General Cyril Ranatunga - Permanent Secretary, Ministry of Defence of Sri Lanka
 General Denis Perera - Commander of the Sri Lanka Army
 General Nalin Seneviratne - Commander of the Sri Lanka Army
 Lieutenant General Denzil Kobbekaduwa - senior officer in the Sri Lanka Army 
 Major General Janaka Perera - senior officer in the Sri Lanka Army 
 Major General Jayantha de S. Jayaratne - senior officer in the Sri Lanka Army
 Kojo Tsikata, Head of National Security and member of the Provisional National Defence Council, Ghana
 Muhoozi Kainerugaba,Commander of the land forces of the Uganda People's Defence Force

Authors and poets
 Antony Beevor (11th Hussars)
 Gerald Brenan
 Gordon Corrigan (Royal Gurkha Rifles)
 Keith Douglas (Nottinghamshire (Sherwood Rangers) Yeomanry Regiment)
 Sir Patrick Leigh Fermor (Irish Guards)
 Ian Fleming - did not complete course
 Harry Graham (Coldstream Guards)
 Richard Gwyn
 Geoffrey Kent
 John Masters (4th Prince of Wales's Own Gurkha Rifles)
 Hugh McManners (29 Commando Regiment RA)
 Michael Morpurgo
 Edward Plunkett, 18th Baron Dunsany
 George W. M. Reynolds
 Adrian Weale (Intelligence Corps)

Artists
Andrew Festing (The Rifle Brigade) - British royal portrait painter

Actors
 Alex Brock (QRH) The Queen's Royal Hussars
 Patrick Cargill (Indian Army)
 David Niven (Highland Light Infantry (City of Glasgow Regiment))
 Richard Todd (Kings Own Yorkshire Light Infantry) and (British 6th Airborne Division)

TV
David Croft (Royal Artillery) - television scriptwriter and producer
Darren Jordon - British TV news presenter

Musicians
 James Blunt (Life Guards)
 Victor Silvester

Sportsmen and Sportswomen
 Allan Cameron (Queen's Own Cameron Highlanders) - founder of the International Curling Federation
 Will Carling (Royal Regiment of Wales) - former captain of the England national rugby union team
 Jim Fox - Olympic gold-medal-winning modern pentathlete
 Wyndham Halswelle - Olympic gold-medal-winning 400 metres runner
 Devon Harris - Jamaican winter-Olympian
 Alastair Heathcote (Blues and Royals (Royal Horse Guards and 1st Dragoons)) - Olympic Rowing silver medalist
 Josh Lewsey (Royal Artillery) - England rugby international
 Mark Phillips (1st The Queen's Dragoon Guards) - Olympic gold-medal-winning horseman, Marathon des Sables and a campaigner against land mines
 Tim Rodber (Green Howards (Alexandra, Princess of Wales's Own Yorkshire Regiment)) -  England rugby international
 Dudley Stokes - Jamaican four time winter-Olympian
 Murray Walker (Royal Scots Greys) - motor-racing commentator
 Peter West (Duke of Wellington's Regiment (West Riding), 33rd of Foot) - cricket commentator
Heather Stanning - Number 1 female rower in the world since 2016, she is a double Olympic champion, double World champion, quadruple World Cup champion and double European champion.
Bill Tancred ([ Royal Army Physical Training Corps]] Two-time Olympic discus thrower [10] Wikipedia Category: Olympic athletes of Great Britain

Explorers
 John Blashford-Snell (Royal Engineers) - was also an instructor at RMAS in the early 1960s
 Sir Chris Bonington (Royal Fusiliers, commissioned into the Royal Tank Regiment)
 Daniel Byles (Royal Army Medical Corps)
 Lawrence "Titus" Oates (6th (Inniskilling) Dragoons)
 Richard Profit (Royal Engineers)
 Ed Stafford, (Devonshire and Dorset Regiment)
 Sir Francis Younghusband (1st King's Dragoon Guards)

Archaeologists
 Martin Carver (Royal Tank Regiment)
 Sir Alexander Cunningham (King's Regiment)
 Augustus Pitt Rivers (Grenadier Guards)
 Sir Mortimer Wheeler (Royal Artillery)

Chefs
Keith Floyd (Royal Tank Regiment)

Clergymen
Mark Elvins (Royal Army Chaplains' Department)

Other
James Hewitt (Life Guards) - committed adultery with Diana, Princess of Wales
Susan Ridge - (Army Legal Services) first female to hold the rank of Major General
Simon Mann (Scots Guards) - mercenary
Sir John Peace - Chairman of Standard Chartered, Experian and Burberry
Timothy Peake - (British Army Air Corps), European Space Agency astronaut
 Roger Took - art historian, museum curator, author and convicted child sex offender
Major General Sir Hugh Clement Sutton (Coldstream Guards) - Lieutenant-Governor and Secretary of Royal Chelsea Hospital
Major-General Sir James Syme Drew, K.B.E., C.B., D.S.O., M.C., D.L., Director of the Territorial Army and Colonel of the Queen's Own Cameron Highlanders
Bill Alexander - Communist activist, commander of the British Battalion of the International Brigades
Ahmad Massoud - leader of the National Resistance Front of Afghanistan
Gáspár Orbán Hungarian lawyer, soldier, religious leader and former professional footballer
David Abel,  Brigadier General of Myanmar Army

References

 
Lists of people by educational affiliation